Procladius is a genus of non-biting midges in the subfamily Tanypodinae of the bloodworm family Chironomidae.

Species
P. abetus Roback, 1971
P. abrupta (Garrett, 1925)
P. appropinquatus (Lundström, 1916)
P. arcuata (Garrett, 1925)
P. barbatulus Sublette, 1964
P. bellus (Loew, 1866)
P. bifida (Garrett, 1925)
P. choreus (Meigen, 1804)
P. clavus Roback, 1971
P. crassinervis (Zetterstedt, 1838)
P. culiciformis (Linnaeus, 1767)
P. curtus Roback, 1971
P. denticulatus Sublette, 1964
P. dentus Roback, 1971
P. desis Roback, 1971
P. ferrugineus (Kieffer, 1918)
P. fimbriatus Wülker, 1959
P. flavifrons Edwards, 1929
P. freemani Sublette, 1964
P. fuscus Brundin, 1956
P. gretis Roback, 1971
P. imicola Kieffer, 1922
P. islandicus (Goetghebuer, 1931)
P. jeris Roback, 1971
P. johnsoni Roback, 1980
P. lugens Kieffer, 1915
P. lugubris (Zetterstedt, 1850)
P. lundstromi Goetghebuer, 1936
P. macrotrichus Roback, 1971
P. nietus Roback, 1971
P. nudipennis Brundin, 1947
P. paludicola Skuse, 1889
P. paragretis Roback, 1971
P. pectinatus Kieffer, 1909
P. prolongatus Roback, 1971
P. riparius (Malloch, 1915)
P. rivulorum (Kieffer, 1913)
P. rufovittatus (van der Wulp, 1874)
P. ruris Roback, 1971
P. sagittalis (Kieffer, 1909)
P. serratus (Kieffer, 1909)
P. signatus (Zetterstedt, 1850)
P. simplicistilus Freeman, 1948
P. sublettei Roback, 1971
P. suecicus Brundin, 1949
P. trifolia (Garrett, 1925)
P. vestitipennis (Kieffer, 1917)
P. vesus Roback, 1971
P. wilhmi Roback, 1966

References

Tanypodinae
Diptera of Europe